The 2022 Women's National Invitation Tournament was a single-elimination tournament of 64 NCAA Division I Women's college basketball teams that were not selected for the field of the 2022
Women's NCAA tournament. The tournament committee announced the 64-team field on March 13, following the selection of the NCAA Tournament field. The tournament started March 16 and ended on April 2 with the championship game televised by CBSSN. The tournament was won by the South Dakota State Jackrabbits.

Participants
The 2022 Postseason WNIT field  consists of 32 teams that receive automatic berths – one berth from each conference – and 32 at-large teams. Three conferences (Big Ten, Big 12, SWAC) rejected their bids.  All Division I teams will be considered for at-large berths, including those who are independent and/or are in the transition process of reaching full NCAA Division I status.  The automatic berth will go to the team that is the highest-finishing team in its conference's regular-season standings not selected for an NCAA Tournament berth, though some of these teams may still receive an at-large berth into the NCAA women's basketball tournament. The remaining team slots will be filled by the top teams available.

Until Selection Sunday, the highest ranked team that failed to win its conference tournament was placed as the automatic qualifier. If they were selected for the NCAA Tournament, they were replaced with the team next selected.

Automatic qualifiers

At-large bids

Bracket
* – Denotes overtime period

Region 1

Region 2

Region 3

Region 4

Semifinals and Championship Game

Game summaries

Semifinals

Championship game

All-tournament team
 Myah Selland (South Dakota State), MVP
 Haleigh Timmer (South Dakota State)
 Sidney Cooks (Seton Hall)
 Lauren Park-Lane (Seton Hall)
 Ilmar’l Thomas (UCLA)
 Kseniya Malashka (Middle Tennessee)

Source:

See also
 2022 NCAA Division I women's basketball tournament
 2022 Women's Basketball Invitational
 2022 Men's National Invitation Tournament

References

Women's National Invitation Tournament
Women's National Invitation Tournament
Women's National Invitation Tournament
Women's National Invitation Tournament
2022 in sports in South Dakota
Basketball competitions in South Dakota